Eryx vittatus is a species of snake in the family Boidae. The species is endemic to Tajikistan.

References 

vittatus
Reptiles described in 1959